V Chennai Warriors is a tennis team representing the Indian city of Chennai in the Champions Tennis League. The team was initially supposed to take part in the 2014 Champions Tennis League but due to unavoidable circumstances they backed out at the last moment and eventually the Hyderabad Aces went on to replace them in the 2014 edition. On 14 November 2015, the V Chennai Warriors franchise was unveiled by Vijay Amritraj, founder of the Champions Tennis League. The team is owned by Prabhu Deva, a renowned actor and Ishari K Ganesh, founder Chairman and Chancellor of the Vels University in Chennai. The players who represented this team in the 2015 season were Rainer Schuettler, Fernando Verdasco, Heather Watson and Vishnu Vardhan. The 2015 tournament began on 23 November and ended on 6 December with the V Chennai Warriors finishing last in Group B with one win and three losses from four games. Group B also had the likes of Hyderabad Aces and Nagpur Orangers.

Home Stadium
The home stadium of the V Chennai Warriors is the SDAT Tennis Stadium in Nungambakkam, Chennai. This historical stadium is also the venue of India's lone ATP World Tour event, the Chennai Open.

Players

2015 season

References

External links

Tennis teams in India
Sports teams in Tamil Nadu
Sport in Chennai
2015 establishments in Tamil Nadu
Sports clubs established in 2015